Pangpoche, also known as Panpoche I is a mountain in the Himalayas of Nepal. On the ridge of Pangpoche to the South in 1.5 kilometers is located Pangpoche II  6,504 meters (21338 ft). 

Both peaks were first ascended by three-men Georgian expedition in Autumn 2019, in alpine style.

First Ascent 
Until Autumn 2019 Pangpoche I has witnessed at least three unsuccessful attempts. The North-East ridge (First ascent line) by Japanese in 2009 and Norwegian team in 2012. The West-Northwest ridge by Italian-Swiss Expedition in 2019.

The first ascent of the peak was archived on 4th of October 2019 by Georgian team. Archil Badriashvili, Giorgi Tepnadze and Bakar Gelashvili climbed the North-East ridge over four days in alpine style.

The same trio has made first ascent of Pangpoche II earlier on September 22nd, climbing complex and dangerous South-West ridge and South-Southwest face in alpine style over three days.

Both ascents have been listed among most significant ascents of 2019, during Piolets d'Or (International Golden Ice Axe Award) 2020.

See also
 List of mountains in Nepal
 List of Ultras of the Himalayas

References

External links
 "Pangpoche I, Nepal" on Peakbagger
The First Ascents in Nepal by American Alpine Journal 
"NÉPAL : MAGNIFIQUES PREMIÈRES ASCENSIONS DES PANGPOCHE I ET II" Alpine Mag France
Planetmountain.com Piolets d'Or 2020: The big list
Six-thousanders of the Himalayas
Mountains of the Gandaki Province